General American or General American English is a group of accents used by a majority of Americans.

General American may also refer to:

 General American Investors Company
 General American Marks Company
 General American Transportation Corporation, now GATX
 General American Life Insurance Company, a subsidiary of MetLife
 General American Oil Company, a subsidiary of Phillips Petroleum Company

See also